Santo DiMera is a fictional character on the soap opera Days of Our Lives. He was portrayed by James Scott from July 9, 2007 to September 28, 2007. Scott reprised the role on August 20, 2008 as a figment of John's imagination. He is the father of Stefano DiMera and established the wealth and power of the DiMera family.

Storylines
Santo is a traveling salesman and the father of crime lord Stefano DiMera. Victor Kiriakis described Santo as "brilliant, wealthy, charming and utterly crooked" with "operations all over the world". While doing business in Galway, Ireland, he became involved with a novice nun, Colleen Brady. Even though he was married and had a son at the time of their first meeting, he is drawn to Colleen and chose to pursue her. Santo and Colleen share letters and begin a relationship after Santo's wife allegedly died. Their relationship is the reason the DiMeras start the Brady–DiMera feud.

According to Stefano, Colleen dies horribly by leaping to her death from a cliff overlooking the ocean (foreshadowing similar future scenes involving members of her family) and Santo blames the Bradys, but it is a simple truth that drove Colleen to her death. Santo's wife never died and Colleen, who had been intimate with Santo, was about to marry him when she learns the truth through her younger brother Shawn Brady, who was inadvertently tipped off by a young Stefano while they were playing together. Santo vows revenge against the Bradys for losing whom he now considers the love of his life, and a vendetta begins. Though occurring (off-screen) through occasional commentary from other Brady family members, viewers learn that the feud is particularly painful and vicious, and occasionally violent. In later years Shawn goes to great lengths—including having his step-son Bo roughed up and briefly held captive in Ireland—to keep the feud's origins a secret.

Years later, in a letter written to Stefano in Rome from his deathbed in New Orleans, Santo tells him the Bradys are living in the American city of Salem and orders his son to come to America and continue the family vendetta, a move that proves beneficial to DiMera Enterprises. The governor of the unnamed state in which Salem is located, who happened to be the father of Stefano's ex-daughter-in-law Liz Chandler, had been bragging that at the time, Salem had been free of the scourge of organized crime, which gave the DiMeras a "clean slate" from which to operate.

Stefano dutifully picks up Santo's mantle, and uses it to his own advantage, carrying out the vendetta and amassing great wealth in the process.  Various letters among various DiMera family members reveal that the key to ending the vendetta is contained in a portfolio that was left in Colleen's church in Galway, St. Malachy's. The sole condition to the vendetta's end is that his grandson EJ DiMera and Sami Brady must be married because EJ and Sami are identical lookalikes to Colleen and Santo, and therefore acceptable proxies to whom Santo considers soulmates.

In February 2008, Colleen is found alive and it is revealed she left Santo, faked her death, and went into hiding in a convent in South America where she had his son, Ryan Brady – then believed to be John Black – and gave him up for adoption. In August 2008, Santo appears as a vision to John, telling him not to let what Stefano did to him alienate him from the people he loves.

In the summer of 2012, the DiMera family begins to fall apart as Stefano's wife Kate Roberts has an affair with Ian McAllister, Stefano reveals that he isn't EJ's real father, and disinherits him and Lexie Carver dies from a brain tumor which is an after effect of André DiMera holding her captive in a tunnel years prior. In June 2012, Stefano appears to have been murdered and EJ is arrested for the crime. After he is released, EJ is kidnapped by Ian who reveals that Stefano is alive, and the man who died was a lookalike. Ian's mother, Yvette was an employee and lover of Santo's. Santo was also a father figure to Ian. According to Ian, Santo intends for Yvette to inherit half of his fortune and Ian has comes to collect. Ian also reveals that he wanted to take everything away from Stefano and reveals that he forged the letter from Alice Horton to Stefano saying that EJ isn't Stefano's son, when he actually was. EJ punches Ian unconscious and calls the police who haul Ian off to a mental institution.

It's later revealed that John isn't really Ryan Brady. John was a baby at the orphanage where Ryan was born.  Ryan died sometime shortly after birth, and the caretakers at the orphanage didn't have the heart to tell an already-heartbroken Colleen that her and Santo's "love child" had passed, so they switched him with John. Colleen raised John as her own until she was no longer able to, and he was adopted by Leopold and Philomena Alamain. Philomena was the sister of Daphne DiMera, Stefano's future common-law wife and biological mother of Leopold and Philomena's other son, Lawrence Alamain. John's parents were eventually revealed to be Maude and Tim Robicheaux (aka: Yo Ling).

References

External links
 
 
 

Days of Our Lives characters
Fictional businesspeople
Fictional business executives
Television characters introduced in 2007
Male characters in television
DiMera family